Gogglebox Australia is an Australian reality television program. It is an adaptation of the British series of the same name. The series, which is produced by Shine Australia, is a co-production between subscription television (STV) channel Lifestyle (owned by Foxtel) and free-to-air (FTA) network Network 10. It airs on Lifestyle first, and then airs on Network 10 a day later.

Production
The concept of Gogglebox Australia is based on the 2013 British reality show Gogglebox, in which people watch and comment on the week's popular television shows and films in their own homes. Producers chose ten households, featuring "a cross-section of modern Australian society, from larrikins to gays, from migrant families to battlers, yuppies and empty-nesters", to discuss the shows. The cast are filmed with remote-controlled cameras, while the crew stay out of their way in other parts of the house.

Voiceover artist Jo Van Es narrates the series. She initially had doubts that she would secure the role following her audition, and thought it would be a short contract. Van Es read a sample of the script without viewing the footage, which she described as "a little bit tricky", and she was told to give a largely neutral delivery. She said, "I thought, 'This is a weird concept for a show. It will probably be something I do for a little while and it will disappear into the winds like a lot of jobs do.' But it's just grown and grown." Van Es starts her recordings during Tuesday afternoons and the sessions last for around an hour. When footage of a certain scene is not available to view, the writers and producers explain to Van Es how the tone of the narration should be and what words to emphasise. Over the seasons, Van Es' delivery has added more sass compared to the "straight" narration style of the early seasons.

Ten episodes of Gogglebox Australia were initially commissioned. The first season aired on The LifeStyle Channel (later rebranded Lifestyle) and Network 10 between February and April 2015. At the conclusion of its debut season, the series was renewed for a second season, which premiered on STV on 30 September 2015, and on FTA on 1 October 2015.

On 21 September 2015, the series was renewed for a third season; which premiered on STV on 6 April 2016, and on FTA on 7 April 2016. On 8 February 2016, it was announced a fourth season had been commissioned; which premiered on STV on 24 August 2016, and on FTA on 25 August 2016.

On 4 November 2016, the series was renewed for a fifth season, which premiered on 15 February 2017. The series was later renewed for a sixth season, which premiered on 4 October 2017.

In November 2017, Foxtel announced that the series was renewed for two further seasons to air in 2018, with each season to increase from eight to 10 episodes. The ninth season premiered on 6 February 2019.

The twelfth season premiered on 26 August 2020 and the thirteenth season on 17 February 2021. The fourteenth season premiered on 8 September 2021.

In October 2021, Foxtel announced a celebrity one off special of Gogglebox would feature in 2022. On 3 February 2022, Hamish and Zoë Foster Blake were confirmed as the first two cast members of the special. On 11 February, the full cast was announced. On 25 February 2022, Dylan Alcott and Andy Allen, Tim Campbell and Anthony Callea joined the special. In March 2022, it was announced there would be more Celebrity specials in the future.

On 25 July 2022, it was announced cast member Di Kershaw had died after a short illness.

Cast

Current

Former

Cast timeline

Notes

Celebrity Gogglebox
This is a list of the celebrities who appeared on Celebrity Gogglebox specials.

Episodes

Awards and nominations

Spin-off

On 4 November 2016, a spin-off series titled Common Sense Australia was commissioned, which similar to Gogglebox Australia is a local adaptation of a British series of the same name, and is jointly commissioned by both Foxtel and Network Ten.

The sister channel and streaming platform of the UK version of the show, E4 and 4 on Demand, aired the first three series of the show.

References

External links
  (10Play)
  (LifeStyle channel)
 

Lifestyle (Australian TV channel) original programming
Network 10 original programming
2010s Australian reality television series
2015 Australian television series debuts
Television series about television
English-language television shows
Television series by Endemol Australia
Australian television series based on British television series
2020s Australian reality television series